YFS may refer to:

 Fort Simpson Airport (IATA airport code), Northwest Territories, Canada
 York Federation of Students, Toronto, Ontario, Canada